Blair Telford (born 7 September 1965) is a New Zealand bobsledder. He competed in the two man and the four man events at the 1988 Winter Olympics.

References

External links
 

1965 births
Living people
New Zealand male bobsledders
Olympic bobsledders of New Zealand
Bobsledders at the 1988 Winter Olympics
Sportspeople from Wellington City